C.P.U. Bach is an interactive music-generating program designed by Sid Meier and Jeff Briggs for the 3DO. It can create Baroque music in the style of Bach for various keyboard, wind, or string instruments and in a variety of forms (e.g., concerti, fugues, minuets, chorales). The compositions are then performed by the software with synchronous 3D graphics on screen showing the virtual instruments being played.

The name of the program is a pun on the initials of one of Bach's actual sons, C.P.E. Bach, and "CPU".

References

Google Patents: System for real-time music composition and synthesis

External links
Article on C.P.U. Bach at GameSpot
Review of C.P.U. Bach by University of Nice Sophia-Antipolis lecturer Michel Buffa

Music creation video games